American country music duo Florida Georgia Line has released five studio albums, two compilation albums, four extended plays, 19 singles (as a lead artist), four featured singles, 27 other charted songs, and 29 music videos. Eighteen of their singles have reached number one on the US Billboard Hot Country Songs, Country Airplay, or Canada Country charts.

Albums

Studio albums

Compilation albums

Extended plays

Singles

As lead artist

As featured artist

Christmas singles

Other charted songs

Music videos

Notes

References 

Country music discographies
Discographies of American artists